Hermon (Herman) Henry Cook (April 26, 1837 – April 12, 1914) was an Ontario lumber merchant and political figure. He represented Simcoe North in the House of Commons of Canada as a Liberal member from 1872 to 1878 and Simcoe East from 1882 to 1891. He also represented Simcoe East in the Legislative Assembly of Ontario as a Liberal member from 1879 to 1882.

Life
He was born in Williamsburgh Township in Dundas County Upper Canada in 1826, the son of George Cook and Sarah Castleman, and was educated in Iroquois. He established himself as a lumber merchant in Simcoe County and set up a sawmill near the current site of the town of Midland, Ontario. With the completion of the Midland Railway of Canada, his timber business prospered. In 1861, he married Lydia White. He ran unsuccessfully for a seat in the Ontario assembly in 1871. Cook resigned his seat in the provincial assembly in 1882 to run for a federal seat. He died in Toronto at the age of 76.

Relatives
His brother James William represented Dundas in the Legislative Assembly of the Province of Canada and his brother Simon represented Dundas in the House of Commons of Canada. His uncle John Cook had earlier represented Dundas in the legislative assembly for Upper Canada.

References

External links

Herman Henry Cook
1837 births
1914 deaths
Liberal Party of Canada MPs
Members of the House of Commons of Canada from Ontario
Ontario Liberal Party MPPs
People from the United Counties of Stormont, Dundas and Glengarry